Nizhneidrisovo (Tübänge İźris) is a rural locality (a village) in Kulchurovsky Selsoviet, Baymaksky District, Bashkortostan, Russia. The population was 365 as of 2010. There are 4 streets.

Geography 
Nizhneidrisovo is located 12 km north of Baymak (the district's administrative centre) by road.

References 

Rural localities in Baymaksky District